Nada is a German punk rock band founded in 2003.

The band has released three albums:
 Zu kalt 2005
 Vamos 2006
 Nach vorn! 2012

References

German punk rock groups